The discography of Australian rock group, Divinyls, consists of five studio albums, 26 singles, 6 compilation albums and one video release.

Albums

Studio albums

Soundtrack albums

Live albums

Compilation albums

Singles

Videography

Music videos

Video albums
Jailhouse Rock (1993) – Filmed live at Boggo Road Gaol

References

Discographies of Australian artists
Rock music group discographies
New wave discographies